"My Mind's Eye" was the sixth song released on 11 November 1966 by the successful English rock group Small Faces. It reached number four on the UK Singles Chart.

Song profile
"My Mind's Eye" was originally intended to be an album track by the band but was released as a single without their knowledge or consent whilst touring in the north of England. Don Arden had been eager for the group to release a song before Christmas and released an unfinished, rough demo copy in his possession. The single was a hit, reaching number 4 on the UK singles chart, but in terms of relations between Arden and Small Faces, it was to signal the end of the band's relationship with both Arden and Decca.

Marriott admitted using part of the popular Christmas song "Gloria in Excelsis Deo" as inspiration for the melody to the chorus.

There were two versions released as a single. One version, following the end of the chorus, had the vocal “In My Mind's Eye.” The other version omitted this vocal.

See also
Small Faces discography

Notes

External links
The Official Small Faces website
"Room For Ravers" – The unofficial Small Faces website
The Darlings of Wapping Wharf Laundrette Small Faces Fanzine

1966 singles
Small Faces songs
Songs written by Steve Marriott
Songs written by Ronnie Lane
1966 songs
Decca Records singles